Timothy "Tim" David Jackson (born 4 July 1969) is an Australian sprinter who competed in the 1996 Summer Olympics.

His PB for the 100m Sprint was 10.24

Tim attended Turramurra High School on Sydney’s Upper North Shore. The school has four House names of which one is Jackson.

International competitions

1Representing Oceania

2Did not start in the semifinals

3Disqualified in the semifinals

References

1969 births
Living people
Australian male sprinters
Olympic athletes of Australia
Athletes (track and field) at the 1990 Commonwealth Games
Athletes (track and field) at the 1994 Commonwealth Games
Athletes (track and field) at the 1996 Summer Olympics
World Athletics Championships medalists
Commonwealth Games medallists in athletics
Commonwealth Games silver medallists for Australia
20th-century Australian people
21st-century Australian people
Medallists at the 1994 Commonwealth Games